The Internet Computer Bureau is an Internet top-level domain custodian based in the United Kingdom, which since 2017 has been a subsidiary of Afilias, a United States corporation. The custodian is responsible for maintaining the .io, .sh, and .ac country code top level domains.

The company was established in 1996 as Internet Computer Bureau plc, and became a private limited company in 2004.

Embroiled in controversy around its involvement in registration of .io domains associated with the Diego Garcia military base following the Expulsion of the Chagossian population, ICB was sold by Paul Kane to Afilias for $70 million in April 2017.

References

Top-level domains